USS Beaufort may refer to any of five ships of the United States Navy named after Beaufort, South Carolina. 

 , a galley constructed by the citizens of Beaufort, South Carolina
 , a seized German steel-hulled collier named Rudolph Blumberg
 , laid down on 21 July 1943
 , a subchaser laid down on 22 May 1943
 , laid down on 19 February 1968 at Lowestoft, England

See also

References
 

United States Navy ship names